A rock-cut tomb is a burial chamber that is cut into an existing, naturally occurring rock formation, so a type of rock-cut architecture. They are usually cut into a cliff or sloping rock face, but may go downward in fairly flat ground. It was a common form of burial for the wealthy in ancient times in several parts of the world.

Important examples are found in Egypt, most notably in the town of Deir el-Medina (Seet Maat), located between the Valley of the Kings and the Valley of the Queens. Other notable clusters include numerous rock-cut tombs in modern Israel, at Naghsh-e Rostam necropolis in Iran, at Myra in Turkey, Petra in modern Jordan, Mada'in Saleh in Saudi Arabia, Sicily (Pantalica) and Larnaca. Indian rock-cut architecture is very extensive, but does not feature tombs.

Chronology
 Egyptian rock-cut tombs (1450 BCE, Thebes, Egypt).
 Phrygian rock-cut tombs such as the Midas monument (700 BCE).
 Etruscan rock-cut tombs, Etruria, Italy (500 BCE).
 Tomb of Darius I (Naqsh-e Rostam (480 BCE).
 Lycian rock-cut tombs (4th century BCE).
 Petra, Jordan (100 CE).

Kokh
A kokh (plural: kokhim), in Latin loculus, plural loculi, is a type of tomb complex characterized by a series of long narrow shafts, in which the deceased were placed for burial, radiating from a central chamber. These tomb complexes were generally carved into a rock face, and were usually closed with a stone slab and had channels cut into the centre of the shaft to drain any water that seeped through the rock.

A kokhim complex survives at the far west end of the Church of the Holy Sepulchre in Jerusalem. The church wall runs through the centre of the complex, which means that the entire entrance area has been carved away by the 4th-century church builders. Many more kokh graves can be found throughout the Judean foothills.

Examples

References